Mihail Arion was a Romanian diplomat. He started his career at the Romanian legation in Petrograd. After World War I he supported Nicolae Titulescu's policies. In 1934 he was appointed secretary general of the Ministry of Foreign Affairs. He was relieved of his duties on August 29, 1936, when Nicolae Titulescu was dismissed.

References

Alexandru-Murad Mironov 1934. – Deschiderea de legaţii la București şi Moscova 
George G. Potra – Reacţii necunoscute la demiterea lui Titulescu – 29 August 1936: O "mazilire perfida"

Romanian diplomats
Year of birth missing